Ətcələr (also, Etchelyar and Atzhalyar) is a village and municipality in the Masally Rayon of Azerbaijan.  It has a population of 840.

References 

Populated places in Masally District